Alpert of Metz (died 1024) was a Benedictine chronicler of the eleventh century. His De diversitate temporum is a major source for the history of Western Europe (particularly for France, Western Germany, Belgium and the Netherlands) in the period it covers, which is 990 to 1021. It was dedicated to Burchard of Worms.

Alpert wrote other works, including a partial biography of Bishop Dietrich I of Metz.

References
Hans van Rij, Sapir Abulafia (editors) (1980) Gebeurtenissen van deze tijd; Een fragment over bisschop Diederik I van Metz; De mirakelen van de heilige Walburg in Tiel.

Notes

External links

Alpertus Mettensis:  De diversitate temporum & De Theodorico I, episcopo mettensi Codex hannoveranus 712a, Leiden 1908

1024 deaths
French chroniclers
Benedictine monks
10th-century births
11th-century Latin writers
11th-century German historians